Freiburg (Breisgau) Güterbahnhof is a German train station. It serves as a goods station in Freiburg im Breisgau. It was erected between 1901 and 1905 in order to separate goods traffic from Freiburg's main train station (Hauptbahnhof), since the Hauptbahnhof could not longer deal with the increased turnover.

References

External links
 Pictures of the old Güterbahnhof during demolition

Transport in Freiburg im Breisgau
Railway stations in Baden-Württemberg